The relationship between China and the United States has been marked by complexity and mutual distrust since the establishment of the People's Republic of China in 1949. However, the two nations maintain close economic ties, which have experienced significant growth since 1980. The relationship is defined by hegemonic rivalry in the Asia-Pacific and is widely recognized as the most important bilateral relationship of the 21st century by world leaders and scholars alike.

, the United States and China are the world's largest and second largest economies respectively, although China has a larger gross domestic product when measured by purchasing power parity. Historically, relations between the two countries have been stable with some periods of open conflict, most notably during the Korean War and the Vietnam War. Currently, the United States and China have mutual political, economic, and security interests, such as the non-proliferation of nuclear weapons, but there are unresolved concerns relating to China's relations with Taiwan and whether the US continues to acknowledge the One China policy and human rights in China. China is the second largest foreign creditor of the United States, after Japan. The two countries remain in dispute over territorial issues in the South China Sea; China claims sovereignty over virtually the entire South China Sea, while the United States rejects China's claims sees it as international waters and asserts the right for its warships and aircraft to conduct operations in the area.

Relations with China began slowly until the 1845 Treaty of Wangxia.  The US opposed spheres of influence by outside powers by promoting the Open Door Policy after 1900, which it believed would allow American economic power to dominate the Chinese market and fend off other foreign competitors. It joined other foreign powers in suppressing the Boxer Rebellion. Washington efforts to encourage American banks to invest in Chinese railways was unsuccessful in the 1900s. President Franklin Roosevelt made support of China against Japan a high priority after 1938.  The US was allied to the Republic of China (ROC) during the Pacific War against Japan (1941–1945). Washington tried and failed to negotiate a compromise between the Nationalist government and Chinese Communist Party (CCP) in 1945–1947. After the victory of the CCP in the Chinese Civil War and declaration of the People's Republic of China in 1949 by Mao Zedong, the relations soured significantly. The US and China fought each other during Korean War. The US refused to recognize the legitimacy of the PRC and continued to recognize the ROC based in Taiwan as the legitimate government of China, and accordingly blocked the PRC's membership in the United Nations until President Richard Nixon's 1972 visit to China marked an unexpected reversal of positions. On January 1, 1979, the US established diplomatic relations with the PRC and recognized it as the sole legitimate government of China; at the same time, it continued unofficial relations with Taiwan within the framework of the Taiwan Relations Act. The political status of Taiwan continues to be a major source of tension between the two countries.

Since Nixon's visit, every US president, with the exception of Jimmy Carter, has toured China. Relations with China strained under President Barack Obama's Asia pivot strategy. The relationship deteriorated sharply under U.S. president Donald Trump and CCP general secretary and president Xi Jinping, with issues such as China's militarization of the South China Sea and Chinese espionage in the United States arising. Trump's abrasively trenchant political rhetoric regarding China both during his campaign and into his nascent Presidency was soon followed by actions with regards to various policy proposals and implementations. The Trump administration labeled China a "strategic competitor" starting with the 2017 National Security Strategy. In January 2018, Trump subsequently launched a trade war against China, banned American companies from selling equipment to Huawei and other companies linked to human rights abuses in Xinjiang, revoked preferential treatment towards Hong Kong after the passage of a national security law, increased visa restrictions on Chinese nationality students and scholars and boosted relations with Taiwan. In response, China has adopted "wolf warrior diplomacy" to deny all accusations of human rights abuses. On the last day of the Trump presidency, the US recognized China's treatment of Uyghurs as a genocide. Over the course of the Trump administration, and especially since the beginning of the US-China trade war since January 2018, geopolitical observers warned that a new Cold War is emerging.

Following Trump's loss in the 2020 Presidential election and his exit from the White House in late January 2021, rising tensions between the United States and China have continued to simmer under the subsequent presidency of Joe Biden. In which Biden has prioritized in confronting and competing with China as one of its focal points in approaching and implementing his foreign policy aims. The Biden administration imposed large-scale restrictions on the sale of semiconductor technology to China, boosted regional alliances against China, and expanded support to Taiwan. However, the Biden administration has also stated that the US seeks "competition, not conflict", with Biden saying that he believed "there need not be a new Cold War".

Country comparison

Chinese viewpoints
As the CCP Chairman, Mao Zedong was able to impose his views on the CCP, the government, the armed forces and the media. Washington ignored the possibility that its decision in June 1950 to defend South Korea, and then in September to invade North Korea, would alarm China, but it did. In November 1950, the Chinese responded by a massive invasion of North Korea that pushed the Allies south of the 38th parallel. By 1951 the situation had stabilized close to the original 38th parallel dividing line. The new Eisenhower administration in Washington in 1953 made it clear the fighting had to stop, hinting it might use nuclear weapons if needed. Finding a solution to the problem of repatriating prisoners of war, both sites settled for an armistice in 1953, and China removed its forces from North Korea. No peace treaty was ever signed, and North Korean and South Korean forces remained into the 21st century in a face-off, with a large American contingent still based in South Korea.

In the late 1950s, Mao could not tolerate the anti-Stalinist program led by Soviet leader Nikita Khrushchev. Ideological tensions escalated between Beijing and Moscow almost to the verge of war. In nearly all capitalist countries and colonies, communist movements split between the old established pro-Moscow element, and the more radical upstart pro-Beijing Maoists. Although still not friendly to the United States, Mao realized that the American anti-Soviet posture in the Cold War was to his advantage as long as China was militarily much less powerful than neighboring Soviet Union.

According to Cai Xia, a retired professor and political theorist formerly at the CCP Central Party School, it was Mao Zedong who "opened the door", but it was Deng Xiaoping who founded the strategic framework for the "engagement" between the U.S. and China. By the end of the Cultural Revolution, China's economy was at the edge of collapse, shaking the foundation of the CCP's rule. China's subsequent rapid economic development and tremendous changes are inseparable from the help of the US government and the American people in areas such as science, technology, education, culture, and economics. Cai said that Deng also chose the "engagement policy" because China could rely on the strength of the US to hedge against Soviet threats.

Cai argued that the "engagement policy" had already ended because there was "fundamental misjudgment by the United States about the nature of the Chinese Communist Party and regime, which in turn has made the US a victim of its own policy." She added, "Wishful thinking about 'engagement' must be replaced by hardheaded defensive measures to protect the United States from the CCP's aggression—while bringing offensive pressures to bear on it, as the Chinese Communist Party is much more fragile than Americans assume."

In the Xi Jinping era, the CCP's stated view of relations with the United States are grounded in a "big power diplomacy" model with three major principles: (1) no confrontation, (2) mutual respect, and (3) win-win cooperation. In this view, a prerequisite for good relations is that both sides must respect each other's baselines to make respective strategic aspirations compatible with one another. Xi advocates "baseline thinking" in China's foreign policy: setting explicit red lines that other countries must not cross. Under this perspective, these tough stances on baseline issues reduce strategic uncertainty, preventing other nations from misjudging China's positions or underestimating its resolve in asserting what it perceives to be in its national interest.

Timeline

Origins of the People's Republic of China
Mao planned for the United States to be the first country with which the People's Republic of China (PRC) established diplomatic relations. In a 1946 speech, Premier Zhou Enlai explained, "It has been rumored recently that Chairman Mao is going to pay a visit to Moscow. Learning this, Chairman Mao laughed and half-jokingly said that if he would ever take a furlough abroad, which would certainly do much good to his present health condition, he would rather go to the United States because he thinks that there he can learn lots of things useful to China."

In early 1949, the People's Liberation Army launched its successful campaign to cross the Yangtze River and capture of the KMT capital, Nanjing. Afterwards, American ambassador John Leighton Stuart remained in the embassy in Nanjing and met twice with Zhou's personal aide Huang Hua. The two made plans for discussions between Zhou and Stuart regarding diplomatic recognition, but when Stuart cabled Secretary of State Dean Rusk for permission to do so, Dusk refused, instructing Stuart to close the embassy and return to the United States.

In December 1950, the People's Republic seized all American assets and properties, totaling $196.8 million. Prior to this, the US had frozen Chinese assets in America following the PRC's entry into the Korean War in November.

The United States did not formally recognize the People's Republic of China PRC for 30 years after its founding. Instead, the US maintained diplomatic relations with the Republic of China government on Taiwan, recognizing it as the sole legitimate government of China.

Korean War

The Korean War began on 25 June with the invasion of South Korea by North Korea, a Communist state with close ties to Moscow and Beijing.  In response, the United Nations Security Council unanimously passed UNSC Resolution 82, which authorized military action against North Korea. Although the Soviet Union had veto power, it was boycotting Security Council proceedings over the UN decision to continue seating the Kuomintang delegation instead of the People's Republic of China delegation. The American-led U.N. offensive pushed the invaders back past the north–south border at the 38th parallel and it began to approach the Yalu River on the China-North Korea border. The UN had authorized the reunification of Korea. Mao Zedong, in full control of  China, could not tolerate hostile forces on its Yalu River border with Korea.  PRC Premier and foreign minister Zhou Enlai's warning that it would intervene in the war on grounds of national security was dismissed by President Truman. In late October 1950, China's intervention began with the Battle of Onjong. During the Battle of the Ch'ongch'on River, the People's Volunteer Army overran or outflanked the UN forces, leading to the defeat of the US Eighth Army. A ceasefire presented by the UN to the PRC shortly after the Battle of the Ch'ongch'on River on 11 December 1950 was rejected by the Mao administration which was convinced of its invincibility after its victory in that battle and the wider Second Phase Offensive, and also wanted to demonstrate China's desire for a total victory through the expulsion of the UN forces from Korea. The Chinese were victorious in the Third Battle of Seoul and the Battle of Hoengsong, but the UN forces recovered and pushed back to about the 38th parallel. Stalemate resulted. The stalemate ended when the Korean Armistice Agreement was signed on 27 July 1953. Since then, a divided Korea has become an important factor in US-China relations, with large American forces stationed in South Korea.

Vietnam War

The People's Republic of China provided resources and training to North Vietnam, and in the summer of 1962, Mao agreed to supply Hanoi with 90,000 rifles and guns free of charge. After the launch of the America's Operation Rolling Thunder in 1965, China sent anti-aircraft units and engineering battalions to North Vietnam to repair the damage caused by American bombing, rebuild roads and railroads, and perform other engineering work, freeing additional hundreds of thousands North Vietnamese Army units for combat against American forces supporting South Vietnam.

The Chinese presence in North Vietnam was well known to US officials, and can explain a number of factors surrounding American strategy in the conflict. In particular, President Lyndon B. Johnson and Secretary of Defense Robert McNamara ruled out the possibility of a ground invasion of North Vietnam early on, for fear of repeating the Korean War but now with a thermonuclear-armed China. However, it is unclear exactly what Beijing's reaction to a US invasion of North Vietnam would have been—Mao Zedong reportedly told journalist Edgar Snow in 1965 that China had no intention of fighting to save the Hanoi regime and would not engage the US military unless it crossed into Chinese territory. On other occasions, Mao expressed confidence that the People's Liberation Army could take on the US again, much like it did in Korea. Whatever Chinese plans might have been, the Johnson administration was unwilling to tempt fate and so US ground troops never crossed into North Vietnam.

Freezing of relations

Between 1949 and 1971, US–China relations were uniformly hostile, with frequent propaganda attacks in both directions. At the 1954 Geneva Conference, Secretary of State John Foster Dulles forbade any contact with the Chinese delegation, refusing to shake hands with Zhou Enlai, the lead Chinese negotiator.  Relations deteriorated under President John F. Kennedy (1961–1963). Before the Cuban Missile Crisis, policymakers in Washington were uncertain whether or not China would break with the Soviet Union on the basis of ideology, national ambitions, and readiness for a role in guiding communist activities in many countries. New insight came with the Sino-Indian border war in November 1962 and Beijing's response to the Cuban Missile Crisis. Kennedy administration officials concluded that China was more militant and more dangerous than the Soviet Union, making better relations with Moscow desirable, with both nations trying to contain Chinese ambitions.  Diplomatic recognition of China remained out of the question, as a crucial veto power on the UN Security Council was held by America's ally on Taiwan.  The United States continued to work to prevent the PRC from taking China's seat in the United Nations and encouraged its allies not to deal with the PRC. The United States placed an embargo on trading with the PRC, and encouraged allies to follow it.
 
The PRC developed nuclear weapons in 1964 and, as later declassified documents revealed, President Johnson considered preemptive attacks to halt its nuclear program. He ultimately decided the measure carried too much risk and it was abandoned. Instead Johnson looked for ways to improve relations. The American public seemed more open to the idea of expanding contacts with China, such as relaxation of the trade embargo. But the War in Vietnam was raging with China aiding North Vietnam. Mao's Great Leap Forward had failed in its goal to properly industrialize China and sparked a famine, and his Cultural Revolution exercised hostility to the U.S. In the end, Johnson made no move to change the standoff.

Despite official non-recognition, the United States and the People's Republic of China held 136 meetings at the ambassadorial level beginning in 1954 and continuing until 1970, first in Geneva and in 1958–1970 in Warsaw.

The Cultural Revolution brought about near-complete isolation of China from the outside world and vocal denunciations of both U.S. imperialism and Soviet revisionism.

Beginning in 1967, the Foreign Claims Settlement Commission established the China Claims Program, in which American citizens could denominate the sum total of their lost assets and property following the Communist seizure of foreign property in 1950. American companies were reluctant to invest in China despite (future leader) Deng Xiaoping's reassurances of a stable business environment.

Rapprochement
The end of the 1960s brought a period of transformation. For China, when American president Johnson decided to wind down the Vietnam War in 1968, it gave China an impression that the US had no interest of expanding in Asia anymore. Meanwhile, relations with the USSR rapidly worsened. This gave Richard Nixon—running for president in 1968—the idea of using that rivalry to improve Washington's relations with Moscow and Beijing, while each rival would cut back support for Hanoi.

This became an especially important concern for the People's Republic of China after the Sino-Soviet border conflict of 1969. The PRC was diplomatically isolated and the leadership came to believe that improved relations with the United States would be a useful counterbalance to the Soviet threat. Zhou Enlai, the Premier of China, was at the forefront of this effort with the committed backing of Mao Zedong, Chairman of the Chinese Communist Party. In 1969, the United States initiated measures to relax trade restrictions and other impediments to bilateral contact, to which China responded. However, this rapprochement process was stalled by the Vietnam War where China was supporting the enemies of the United States. Communication between Chinese and American leaders, however, was conducted through Romania, Pakistan and Poland as intermediaries.

In the United States, academics such as John K. Fairbank and A. Doak Barnett pointed to the need to deal realistically with the Beijing government, while organizations such as the National Committee on United States–China Relations sponsored debates to promote public awareness. Many saw the specter of Communist China behind communist movements in Vietnam, Cambodia, and Laos, but a growing number concluded that if the PRC would align with the US it would mean a major redistribution of global power against the Soviets. Mainland China's market of nearly one billion consumers appealed to American business. Senator J. William Fulbright, Chair of the Senate Foreign Relations Committee, held a series of hearings on the matter.
 
Richard M. Nixon mentioned in his inaugural address that the two countries were entering an era of negotiation after an era of confrontation. Although Nixon during his 1960 presidential campaign had vociferously supported Chiang Kai-Shek, by the second half of the decade, he increasingly began to speak of there "being no reason to leave China angry and isolated". Nixon's election as president in 1968 was initially met with hostility by Beijing—an editorial in the People's Daily denounced him as "a chieftain whom the capitalist world had turned to out of desperation". Nixon believed it was in the American national interest to forge a relationship with China, even though there were enormous differences between the two countries.  He was assisted in this by his National Security Advisor Henry Kissinger. Domestic politics also entered into Nixon's thinking, as the boost from a successful courting of the PRC could help him in the 1972 American presidential election. He also worried that one of the Democrats would preempt him and go to the PRC before he had the opportunity.

In 1971, an unexpectedly friendly encounter between the American and Chinese ping-pong athletes called Glenn Cowan and Zhuang Zedong in Japan opened the way for a visit to China, which Chairman Mao personally approved.  In April 1971, the athletes became the first Americans to officially visit China since the communist takeover. The smooth acceptance of this created the term "ping-pong diplomacy", and gave confidence to both sides. The ping-pong diplomacy allowed reporters into the country as well, opening up communication to both sides, and breaking a barrier that had been there previously. This smoothed out the start of the trade partnership that was going to happen later. In July 1971, Henry Kissinger feigned illness while on a trip to Pakistan and did not appear in public for a day. He was actually on a top-secret mission to Beijing to negotiate with Chinese Premier Zhou Enlai.

Kissinger and his aides did not receive a warm welcome in Beijing, and the hotel they stayed in was equipped with pamphlets excoriating US imperialism. However, the meeting with Zhou Enlai was productive, and the Chinese premier expressed his hope for improved China-US relations. He commented that the US had intentionally isolated China, not vice versa, and any initiative to restore diplomatic ties had to come from the American side. Zhou spoke of the late President Kennedy's plans to restore relations with China and told Kissinger "We are willing to wait as long as we need to. If these negotiations fail, in time another Kennedy or another Nixon will come along."

On 15 July 1971, President Richard Nixon revealed the mission to the world and that he had accepted an invitation to visit the PRC.

This announcement caused immediate shock around the world. In the United States, some hard-line anti-communists (most notably libertarian Republican Arizona Senator Barry Goldwater) denounced the decision, but most public opinion supported the move and Nixon saw the jump in the polls he had been hoping for. Since Nixon had sterling anti-communist credentials he was all but immune to being called "soft on communism". Nixon and his aides wanted to ensure that press coverage offered dramatic imagery. Nixon was particularly eager for strong news coverage.

Within the PRC there was also opposition from left-wing elements. This effort was allegedly led by Lin Biao, head of the military, who died in a mysterious plane crash over Mongolia while trying to defect to the Soviet Union. His death silenced most internal dissent over the visit.

Internationally, reactions varied. In the communist world, the Soviets were very concerned that two major enemies seemed to have resolved their differences, and the new world alignment contributed significantly to the policy of détente. Romania's president Nicolae Ceaușescu praised the US initiative as a "move for world peace". Several communist nations, including Cuba, Albania, and North Vietnam, accused China of "capitulationism to the imperialists". North Korea proclaimed that it was the reverse and that the US had been forced to capitulate to China, having failed to isolate it.

America's European allies and Canada were pleased by the initiative, especially since many of them had already recognized the PRC. In Asia, the reaction was far more mixed. Japan was annoyed that it had not been told of the announcement until fifteen minutes before it had been made, and feared that the Americans were abandoning them in favor of the PRC. A short time later, Japan also recognized the PRC and committed to substantial trade with the continental power. South Korea and South Vietnam were both concerned that peace between the United States and the PRC could mean an end to American support for them against their communist enemies. Throughout the period of rapprochement, both countries had to be regularly assured that they would not be abandoned. Taiwan's Chiang Kai-Shek criticized the move, saying: "Today any international appease movement to evil power to seek for political power balance would never helpful for the world peace, instead it elongated the hardship of our 700 million people, and expand the disaster of the world."

From 21 to 28 February 1972, President Nixon traveled to Beijing, Hangzhou, and Shanghai. At the conclusion of his trip, the US and the PRC issued the Shanghai Communiqué, a statement of their respective foreign policy views. In the Communiqué, both nations pledged to work toward the full normalization of diplomatic relations. This did not lead to immediate recognition of the People's Republic of China but 'liaison offices' were established in Beijing and Washington. The US acknowledged the PRC position that all Chinese on both sides of the Taiwan Strait maintain that there is only one China and that Taiwan is part of China. The statement enabled the US and PRC to temporarily set aside the issue of Taiwan and open trade and communication. Also, the US and China both agreed to take action against 'any country' that is to establish 'hegemony' in the Asia-Pacific. On several issues, such as the ongoing conflicts in Korea, Vietnam, and Israel, the US and China were unable to reach a common understanding.

Most major anti-US propaganda disappeared in China after the Nixon visit; although there was still occasional criticism of US imperialism, the Soviet Union had definitively become China's arch-foe in the 1970s.

The rapprochement with the United States benefited the PRC immensely and greatly increased its security for the rest of the Cold War. It has been argued that the United States, on the other hand, saw fewer benefits than it had hoped for, inasmuch as China continued to back America's enemies in Hanoi and Pyongyang. Eventually, however, the PRC's suspicion of Vietnam's motives led to a break in China-Vietnamese cooperation and, upon the Vietnamese invasion of Cambodia in 1979, the Sino-Vietnamese War. Both China and the United States backed combatants in Africa against Soviet and Cuban-supported movements. The economic benefits of normalization were slow as it would take decades for American products to penetrate the vast Chinese market. While Nixon's China policy is regarded by many as the highlight of his presidency, others such as William Bundy have argued that it provided very little benefit to the United States.

Liaison Office (1973–1978)

In May 1973, in an effort to build toward formal diplomatic relations, the US and the PRC established the United States Liaison Office (USLO) in Beijing and a counterpart PRC office in Washington. In 1973 to 1978, such distinguished Americans as David K. E. Bruce, George H. W. Bush, Thomas S. Gates, Jr., and Leonard Woodcock served as chiefs of the USLO with the personal rank of ambassador. China made clear that it considered the Soviet Union its chief adversary, and urged the United States to be powerful, thereby distracting Moscow. Liaison officer George Bush concluded, "China keeps wanting us to be strong, wanting us to defend Europe, wanting us to increase our defense budgets, etc." Bush concluded that American engagement was essential to support markets, allies, and stability in Asia and around the world.

President Gerald Ford visited the PRC in 1975 and reaffirmed American interest in normalizing relations with Beijing. Shortly after taking office in 1977, President Jimmy Carter again reaffirmed the goals of the Shanghai Communiqué. Secretary of State Cyrus Vance, Carter's National Security Advisor Zbigniew Brzezinski, and senior staff member of the National Security Council Michel Oksenberg encouraged Carter to seek full diplomatic and trade relations with China. Although Brzezinski sought to quickly establish a security relationship with Beijing to counter the Soviet Union, Carter sided with Vance in believing that such a deal would threaten existing U.S.-Soviet relations, including the SALT II negotiations. Thus, the administration decided to cautiously pursue political normalization and not military relations. Vance, Brzezinski, and Oksenberg traveled to Beijing in early 1978 to work with Leonard Woodcock, then head of the liaison office, to lay the groundwork to do so. The United States and the People's Republic of China announced on 15 December 1978, that the two governments would establish diplomatic relations on 1 January 1979.

Normalization

In the Joint Communiqué on the Establishment of Diplomatic Relations, dated 1 January 1979, the United States transferred diplomatic recognition from Taipei to Beijing. The US reiterated the Shanghai Communiqué's acknowledgment of the Chinese position that there is only one China and that Taiwan is a part of China; Beijing acknowledged that the American people would continue to carry on commercial, cultural, and other unofficial contacts with the people of Taiwan.

Taiwan, although fully expecting this step, nonetheless expressed disappointment at having not been consulted first. The reaction of the communist world was similar to 1972, with the Soviet Union and its allies in Eastern Europe mostly being noncommittal, Romania welcoming the move, and Cuba and Albania being strongly against it. North Korea issued a statement congratulating "our brotherly neighbors for ending long-hostile relations with the US".

Vice Premier Deng Xiaoping's January 1979 visit to Washington initiated a series of important, high-level exchanges which continued until the spring of 1989. This resulted in many bilateral agreements, especially in the fields of scientific, technological, and cultural interchange, as well as trade relations. Since early 1979, the United States and the PRC have initiated hundreds of joint research projects and cooperative programs under the Agreement on Cooperation in Science and Technology, the largest bilateral program.

On 1 March 1979, the two countries formally established embassies in each other's capitals. In 1979, outstanding private claims were resolved and a bilateral trade agreement was completed. Vice President Walter Mondale reciprocated Vice Premier Deng's visit with an August 1979 trip to China. This visit led to agreements in September 1980 on maritime affairs, civil aviation links, and textile matters, as well as a bilateral consular convention.

The threats of the Soviet invasion of Afghanistan and Vietnamese invasion of Cambodia were major factors that brought Washington and Beijing closer than ever before. US-China military cooperation began in 1979. In 1980, China allowed the United States to establish electronic listening stations in Xinjiang so the United States could monitor Soviet rocket launches in central Asia. In exchange, the United States authorized the sale of dual-use civilian and military technology and nonlethal military equipment to China.

Chinese demands for advanced technology from the US were not always met, in part due to opposition from Congressmen who either distrusted technology transfer to a communist nation out of principle, or concern that there was no guarantee that such technology would not end up in the hands of unfriendly third parties. In 1983, the US State Department changed its classification of China to "a friendly, developing nation", thereby increasing the amount of technology and armaments that could be sold. The skepticism of some US Congressmen was not entirely unmerited as China during the 1980s continued to sell arms to Iran and other states that were openly hostile to American interests.

As a consequence of high-level and working-level contacts initiated in 1980, US dialogue with the PRC broadened to cover a wide range of issues, including global and regional strategic problems, political-military questions, including arms control, UN, and other multilateral organization affairs, and international narcotics matters. New York City and Beijing became sister cities.

High-level exchanges continued to be a significant means for developing US–PRC relations in the 1980s. President Ronald Reagan and Premier Zhao Ziyang made reciprocal visits in 1984. Reagan's visit to Beijing went well, however a speech he made criticizing the Soviet Union and praising capitalism, democracy, and freedom of religion was not aired on Chinese state television. In July 1985, Chinese President Li Xiannian traveled to the United States, the first such visit by a PRC head of state. Vice President Bush visited the PRC in October 1985 and opened the US Consulate General in Chengdu, the US's fourth consular post in the PRC. Further exchanges of cabinet-level officials occurred between 1985 and 1989, capped by President Bush's visit to Beijing in February 1989.

Shortly after being elected president in 1980, Ronald Reagan made a speech criticizing the PRC and welcoming restoration of ties with Taiwan. These remarks aroused initial concern in Beijing, but Reagan's advisers quickly apologized for his comments, and the president-elect soon retracted them. Reagan's first two years in office saw some deterioration in US-China relations due to the president's vociferous anti-communism, as well as the inability of the two nations to come to a common understanding over the Korean conflict, the Israel–Palestine conflict, or the Falklands War. In 1982, Chinese leader Deng Xiaoping, in a reiteration of Mao Zedong's "Three Worlds" theory, criticized both the US and Soviet Union for imperialism. In 1983, there were quarrels over a Chinese tennis player, Hu Na, who defected to the US, and over an incident where an Olympic parade float in New York City displayed the flag of Taiwan rather than the PRC's flag.

In the period before the Tiananmen Square protests of 1989, a growing number of cultural exchange activities gave the American and Chinese peoples broad exposure to each other's cultural, artistic, and educational achievements. Numerous mainland Chinese professional and official delegations visited the United States each month. Many of these exchanges continued after the suppression of the Tiananmen protests.

Taiwan issue

Since the renewal of US-China relations in early 1979, the Taiwan issue remained a major source of contention. After the announcement of the intention to establish diplomatic relations with Mainland China (PRC) on 15 December 1978, the Republic of China (Taiwan) immediately condemned the United States, leading to rampant protests in both Taiwan and in the US. In April 1979, the US Congress signed into law the Taiwan Relations Act, permitting unofficial relations with Taiwan to flourish and granting the right to provide Taiwan with arms of a defensive character. Its passage prompted Deng to begin to view the United States as an insincere partner willing to abandon its prior commitments to China. The expanding relationship that followed normalization was threatened in 1981 by PRC objections to the level of US arms sales to the Republic of China on Taiwan. Secretary of State Alexander Haig visited China in June 1981 in an effort to resolve Chinese concerns about America's unofficial relations with Taiwan. Vice President Bush visited the PRC in May 1982. Eight months of negotiations produced the US-PRC Joint Communiqué of 17 August 1982. In this third communiqué, the US stated its intention to gradually reduce the level of arms sales to the Republic of China, and the PRC described as a fundamental policy their effort to strive for a peaceful resolution to the Taiwan question.

When Donald Trump won the 2016 presidential election, contention over the Taiwan issue intensified; President Trump became the first sitting US president since Jimmy Carter in 1979 to have any formal political or diplomatic contacts with Taiwan when he decided to receive a phone call from president Tsai Ing-Wen. Trump has expanded the duties of the US' de facto embassy in Taipei - the American Institute in Taiwan - by adding more security personnel, and has overseen increasing non-diplomatic visits of Tsai Ing-Wen and Congressmen to each other's countries/regions. In addition, American warships have reportedly crossed the Taiwan strait and increased military drills with Taiwan, which mainland China views as a direct threat to its sovereignty.

George H. W. Bush administration (1989–1993) 

Americans who had been optimistic about the emergence of democratic characteristics in response to the rapid economic growth and China were stunned and disappointed by the brutal crackdown of the pro-democratic Tiananmen Square protests in 1989.  The U.S. and other governments enacted a number of measures against China's violation of human rights. The US suspended high-level official exchanges with the PRC and weapons exports from the US to the PRC. The US also imposed a number of economic sanctions. In the summer of 1990, at the G7 Houston summit, the West called for renewed political and economic reforms in mainland China, particularly in the field of human rights.

The Tiananmen event disrupted the US-China trade relationship, and US investors' interest in mainland China dropped dramatically. Tourist traffic fell off sharply. The Bush administration denounced the repression and suspended certain trade and investment programs on 5 and 20 June 1989, however Congress was responsible for imposing many of these actions, and the White House itself took a far less critical attitude of Beijing, repeatedly expressing hope that the two countries could maintain normalized relations. Some sanctions were legislated while others were executive actions. Examples include:

The US Trade and Development Agency (TDA): new activities in mainland China were suspended from June 1989 until January 2001, when President Bill Clinton lifted this suspension.
Overseas Private Insurance Corporation (OPIC): new activities have been suspended since June 1989.
Development Bank Lending/International Monetary Fund (IMF) Credits: the United States does not support development bank lending and will not support IMF credits to the PRC except for projects that address basic human needs.
Munitions List Exports: subject to certain exceptions, no licenses may be issued for the export of any defense article on the US Munitions List. This restriction may be waived upon a presidential national interest determination.
Arms Imports – import of defense articles from the PRC was banned after the imposition of the ban on arms exports to the PRC. The import ban was subsequently waived by the Administration and reimposed on 26 May 1994. It covers all items on the BATFE's Munitions Import List. During this critical period, J. Stapleton Roy, a career US Foreign Service Officer, served as ambassador to Beijing.

US-China military ties and arms sales were terminated in 1989 and as of 2022 have never been restored. Chinese public opinion became more hostile to the United States after 1989, as typified by the 1996 manifesto China Can Say No. The authors called for Beijing to take more aggressive actions against the United States and Japan in order to build a stronger international position. The Chinese government at first endorsed the manifesto, then repudiated it as irresponsible.

The end of the Cold War and dissolution of the Soviet Union removed the original motives underlying rapprochement between China and the United States. Motivated by concerns that the United States might curtail support for China's modernization, Deng adopted a low-profile foreign policy to live with the fact of United States hegemony and focus primarily on domestic development.

Clinton administration (1993–2001)

Running for president in 1992, Bill Clinton sharply criticized his predecessor George H. W. Bush for prioritizing profitable trade relationships over human rights issues in China. As president, however, Clinton de-linked the issue of China's Most Favored Nation status from its human rights record. He did articulate a desired set of goals for China. They included free emigration, no exportation of goods made with prison labor, release of peaceful protesters, treatment of prisoners in terms of international standards, recognition of the distinct regional culture of Tibet, permitting international television and radio coverage, and observation of human rights specified by United Nations resolutions. China refused to comply, and by summer 1994 Clinton admitted defeat and called for a renewal of normalized trade relations. However congressional pressure, especially from the Republican Party, forced Clinton to approve arms sales to Taiwan, despite the strong displeasure voiced by Beijing.

In July 1993, the U.S. Navy stopped the Yinhe, a Chinese container ship, en route to Kuwait on international waters, cut off its GPS so that it lost direction and was forced to anchor, and held it in place for twenty-four days. The United States incorrectly alleged that the Yinhe was carrying precursors of chemical weapons for Iran. It eventually forced an inspection of the ship in Saudi Arabia, but found no chemical precursors. The United States refused China's request for a formal apology and refused to pay compensation. This incident was viewed in China as international bullying by the United States. Nonetheless, Chinese President Jiang Zemin adopted a diplomatic posture of goodwill and a "sixteen-characters formula" to working with the United States: "enhancing confidence, avoiding troubles, expanding cooperation, and avoiding confrontation".

In 1996, the People's Liberation Army conducted military exercises in the Taiwan Strait in an apparent effort to intimidate the Republic of China electorate before the pending presidential elections, triggering the Third Taiwan Strait Crisis. The United States dispatched two aircraft carrier battle groups to the region. Subsequently, tensions in the Taiwan Strait diminished and relations between the US and the PRC improved, with increased high-level exchanges and progress on numerous bilateral issues, including human rights, nuclear proliferation, and trade.

China's leader Jiang Zemin visited the United States in the fall of 1997, the first state visit to the US by a paramount leader since 1979. In connection with that visit, the two sides came to a consensus on implementation of their 1985 agreement on Peaceful Nuclear Cooperation, as well as a number of other issues. President Clinton visited the PRC in June 1998. He traveled extensively in mainland China, and had direct interaction with the Chinese people, including live speeches and a radio show which allowed the President to convey a sense of American ideals and values. In a speech at Peking University, he told the assembled students that the 21st Century could be "your century", and expressed his view that technology, including the internet, would help ease any tensions China's rise might cause. President Clinton was criticized by some, however, for failing to pay adequate attention to human rights abuses in mainland China. When Clinton visited Shanghai, he declared the "three nos" for United States foreign policy towards China: (1) not recognizing two Chinas, (2) not supporting Taiwanese independence, and (3) not supporting Taiwanese efforts to join international organizations for which sovereignty is a membership requirement.

Relations were damaged for a time by the United States bombing of the Chinese embassy in Belgrade on May 7, 1999, which was stated by the White House to be miscoordination between intelligence and the military. The bombing created outrage among Chinese people, who did not accept the United States claim that the bombing was accidental. For several days, Beijing was rocked by massive anti-US demonstrations. Deeming the importance of the bilateral relationship too great to be harmed by the embassy bombing, President Jiang sought to calm the Chinese public outrage. By the end of 1999, relations began to gradually improve. In October 1999, the two countries reached an agreement on compensation for families of those who were victims, as well as payments for damages to respective diplomatic properties in Belgrade and China. US-China relations in 1999 were also damaged by accusations that a Chinese-American scientist at the Los Alamos National Laboratory had given US nuclear secrets to Beijing.

George W. Bush administration (2001–2009)

As a presidential candidate in 2000, George W. Bush repeatedly criticized the Clinton-Gore administration for being too friendly with China, which he warned was a strategic competitor.

In the Hainan Island incident of April 1, 2001, a United States US EP-3 surveillance aircraft collided mid-air with a Chinese Shenyang J-8 jet fighter over the South China Sea. China sought a formal apology, and accepted United States Secretary of State Colin Powell's expression of "very sorry" as sufficient. The incident nonetheless created negative feelings towards the United States by the Chinese public and increased public feelings of Chinese nationalism.

Early on as President Bush increased arms sales to Taiwan, including 8 submarines. Bush's hostile position toward China was suddenly reversed after the September 11 terrorist attacks, and his friendly attitude toward Taiwan became a casualty. Soon he was calling China a strategic partner in the war on terror and postponing deals with Taiwan.

Two PRC citizens died in the attacks on the World Trade Center.  President Jiang Zemin sent a telegram to Bush within hours of the attack expressing China's condolences and opposition to terror; Bush responded with a phone call the next day stating that he looked forward to working with Jiang and other world leaders to oppose terrorism. Chinese companies and individuals also sent expressions of condolences to their American counterparts. The PRC, itself troubled by Muslim separatists in Xinjiang, offered strong public support for the War on Terror in APEC China 2001. The PRC voted in favor of UNSCR 1373, publicly supported the coalition campaign in Afghanistan, and contributed $150 million of bilateral assistance to Afghan reconstruction following the defeat of the Taliban. Shortly after the 11 September terrorist attacks, the US and PRC also commenced a counterterrorism dialogue. In a March 2002 trip to Beijing, Bush articulated his desire for a "constructive, cooperative, and candid" relationship with China. The third round of that dialogue was held in Beijing in February 2003.

In the United States, the threat of terrorist attacks by al-Qaeda greatly changed the nature of its security concerns. It was no longer plausible to argue, as the Blue Team had earlier asserted, that the PRC was the primary security threat to the United States, and the need to focus on the Middle East and the War on Terror made the avoidance of potential distractions in East Asia a priority for the United States.

There were initial fears among the PRC leadership that the war on terrorism would lead to an anti-PRC effort by the US, especially as the US began establishing bases in Central Asian countries like Uzbekistan and Tajikistan and renewed efforts against Iraq. The Chinese government was relieved after the United States tied up major national resources with its 2003 invasion of Iraq. China believed that the United States' Middle East meant that the United States would need China's help on issues such as counterterrorism, Middle Eastern stability, and nuclear non-proliferation and viewed the United States' focus as conducive to China's emphasis on stability and domestic development.

China and the United States have also worked closely on regional issues, including those pertaining to North Korea and its nuclear weapons program. China has stressed its opposition to North Korea's decision to withdraw from the Treaty on the Non-Proliferation of Nuclear Weapons, its concerns over North Korea's nuclear capabilities, and its desire for a non-nuclear Korean Peninsula. It also voted to refer North Korea's noncompliance with its International Atomic Energy Agency obligations to the UN Security Council.

Taiwan remained a volatile issue, but one that remained under control. The United States policy toward Taiwan involved emphasizing the Four Noes and One Without. On occasion the United States rebuked Republic of China (Taiwan) President Chen Shui-bian for provocative pro-independence rhetoric. As Bush made his opposition to Taiwan independence clear, the PRC saw the United States as playing a positive role in restraining the separatist movement. In 2005, the PRC passed the Anti-Secession Law which stated that the PRC would be prepared to resort to "non-peaceful means" if Taiwan declared formal independence. Many critics of the PRC, such as the Blue Team, argue that the PRC was trying to take advantage of the US war in Iraq to assert its claims on Republic of China's territory. In 2008, Taiwan voters elected Ma Ying-jeou. Ma, representing the Kuomintang, campaigned on a platform that included rapprochement with mainland China. His election has significant implications for the future of cross-strait relations.

China's paramount leader Hu Jintao visited the United States in April 2006. Bush visited Beijing in August for four days to attend the 2008 Summer Olympics. The president and his wife Laura were accompanied by Bush's father, the former president, and his mother Barbara.

A public opinion poll of a representative population of China conducted by Pew in spring 2008 shows:
 Views toward Japan are especially negative – 69% have an unfavorable opinion of Japan, and a significant number of Chinese (38%) consider Japan an enemy. Opinions of the United States also tend to be negative, and 34% describe the U.S. as an enemy, while just 13% say it is a partner of China. Views about India are mixed at best – 25% say India is a partner, while a similar number (24%) describe it as an enemy.

Obama administration (2009–2017)

The 2008 US presidential election centered on issues of war and economic recession, but candidates Barack Obama and John McCain also spoke extensively regarding US policy toward China. Both favored cooperation with China on major issues, but they differed with regard to trade policy. Obama expressed concern that the value of China's currency was being deliberately set low to benefit China's exporters. McCain argued that free trade was crucial and was having a transformative effect in China. Still, McCain noted that while China might have shared interests with the US, it did not share American values.

The election of Barack Obama in 2008 generated positive reactions from most locals and state-run media outlets in China. His presidency fostered hopes for increased co-operation and heightened levels of friendship between the two nations. On 8 November 2008, Chinese leader Hu Jintao and Obama shared a phone conversation in which Hu congratulated Obama on his election victory. During the conversation both parties agreed that the development of US-China relations is not only in the interest of both nations, but also in the interests of the world.

Other organizations within China also held positive reactions to Obama's, particularly with his commitment to revising American climate change policy. Greenpeace published an article detailing how Obama's victory would spell positive change for investment in the green jobs sector as part of a response to the financial crisis gripping the world at the time of Obama's inauguration. A number of organizations, including the US Departments of Energy and Commerce, non-governmental organizations such as the Council on Foreign Relations and the Brookings Institution, and universities, have been working with Chinese counterparts to discuss ways to address climate change. Both US and Chinese governments have addressed the economic downturn with massive stimulus initiatives. The Chinese have expressed concern that "Buy American" components of the US plan discriminate against foreign producers, including those in China.

As the two most influential and powerful countries in the world, there have been increasingly strong suggestions within American political circles of creating a G-2 (Chimerica) relationship for the United States and China to work out solutions to global problems together.

The Strategic Economic Dialogue initiated by then-US President Bush and Hu and led by US Treasury Secretary Henry Paulson and Chinese Vice Premier Wu Yi in 2006 was broadened by the Obama administration. Now called the U.S.–China Strategic and Economic Dialogue, it was then led by US Secretary of State Hillary Clinton and US Secretary of the Treasury Timothy Geithner for the United States and Vice Premier Wang Qishan and Chinese State Councilor Dai Bingguo for China. The focus of the first set of meetings in July 2009 was in response to the economic crisis, finding ways to cooperate to stem global warming and addressing issues such as the proliferation of nuclear weapons and humanitarian crises.

Obama visited China on 15–18 November 2009 to discuss economic worries, concerns over nuclear weapon proliferation, and the need for action against climate change.

In January 2010, the US proposed a $6.4 billion arms sale to the Republic of China (Taiwan). In response, the PRC threatened to impose sanctions on US companies supplying arms to Taiwan and suspend cooperation on certain regional and international issues.

On 19 February 2010, Obama met with the Dalai Lama, accused by China of "fomenting unrest in Tibet." After the meeting, China summoned the US ambassador to China, Jon Huntsman, but Time has described the Chinese reaction as "muted", speculating that it could be because "the meeting came during the Chinese New Year... when most officials are on leave". Some activists criticized Obama for the relatively low profile of the visit.

In 2012, the PRC criticized Obama's new defense strategy, which it said was aimed at isolating China in the East Asian region. Obama is looking to increase US military influence in the area with a rotating presence of forces in friendly countries.

In March 2012, China suddenly began cutting back its purchases of oil from Iran, which along with some signs on sensitive security issues like Syria and North Korea, showed some coordination with the Obama administration.

In March 2013, the US and China agreed to impose stricter sanctions on North Korea for conducting nuclear tests, which sets the stage for UN Security Council vote. Such accord might signal a new level of cooperation between the US and China.

In an effort to build a "new model" of relations,  Obama met Paramount leader Xi Jinping for two days of meetings, between 6 and 8 June 2013, at the Sunnylands estate in Rancho Mirage, California. The summit was considered "the most important meeting between an American president and a Chinese Communist leader in 40 years, since President Nixon and Chairman Mao," according to Joseph Nye, a political scientist at Harvard University. The leaders concretely agreed to combat climate change and also found strong mutual interest in curtailing North Korea's nuclear program. However, the leaders remained sharply divided over cyber espionage and U.S. arms sales to Taiwan. Xi was dismissive of American complaints about cyber security. Tom Donilon, the outgoing U.S. National Security Adviser, stated that cyber security "is now at the center of the relationship", adding that if China's leaders were unaware of this fact, they know now.

Obama supported the One-China policy. In 2014, Obama stated that "We recognize Tibet as part of the People's Republic of China. We are not in favor of independence."

In May 2015, U.S. Secretary of Defense Ashton Carter warned China to halt its rapid island-building in the South China Sea.

Obama hosted Xi for a bilateral meeting on the margins of the Nuclear Security Summit on 31 March 2016.

Trump administration (2017–2021)

 

The presidency of Donald Trump led to a shift in U.S. relations with China.

President-elect Trump's telephone conversation with the president of Taiwan Tsai Ing-wen on 2 December 2016 was the first such contact with Taiwan by an American president-elect or president since 1979. It provoked Beijing to lodge a diplomatic protest ("stern representations"). Trump went on to clarify his move by telling Fox News, "I fully understand the 'one China' policy, but I don't know why we have to be bound by a 'one China' policy unless we make a deal with China having to do with other things, including trade."

On President Trump's inauguration day, an official from the People's Liberation Army wrote on the official website that the US's military build-up in Asia, and its push to arm South Korea with the THAAD missile-defense system were provocative "hot spots getting closer to ignition" and that the chances of war had become "more real".

On 23 January, speaking about China's claims to sovereignty over the Spratly Islands in the South China Sea, White House spokesman Sean Spicer said, "It's a question of if those islands are in fact in international waters and not part of China proper, then yeah, we're going to make sure that we defend international territories from being taken over by one country."

On 4 January, on a visit to Japan, U.S. Defense Secretary James Mattis reaffirmed Washington's commitment under the Treaty of Mutual Cooperation and Security between the United States and Japan to defending Japan, including the Senkaku Islands (the East China Sea) that are claimed by China.

On 9 February, Trump spoke with China's leader Xi Jinping over the phone discussing a wide range of issues; Trump was said to have re-iterated the United States' commitment to the status quo 'one-China' policy.

In a 3 July 2017 telephone conversation with Trump, Xi stated, "China-US relations have made great progress in recent days, but they have also been affected by some negative factors." By "negative factors", Geng Shuang, a Chinese government spokesmen, explained in a televised briefing: "Under the pretext of navigational freedom, the American side once again sent military vessels into the Chinese territorial waters of Xisha (Paracel) Islands. It has violated Chinese and international law, infringed upon Chinese sovereignty, and disrupted order, peace and security of the relevant waters and put in jeopardy facilities and personnel on the relevant Chinese islands. It is a serious political and military provocation. The Chinese side is strongly dissatisfied with and firmly opposed to the relevant actions by the US."

On 13 March 2018, the out-going US Secretary of State, Rex Tillerson, said: "Much work remains to establish a clear view of the nature of our future relationship with China, how shall we deal with one-another over the next fifty years, and ensure a period of prosperity for all of our peoples, free of conflict between two very powerful nations."

China enforced punitive tariffs on 128 categories of American goods on 1 April 2018 in retaliation for the Trump Administration's national-security levies on steel and aluminum imports the previous month. The Chinese Government's response is measured, affecting $3 billion in annual trade or about 2% of U.S. goods exports to China. By late September 2018, the Trump Administration had placed tariffs (25% tax increase) on $250 billion worth of Chinese goods, in an attempt to offset the trade imbalance between the two countries.

In what put additional strain on US-China relations, Huawei's vice-chair and CFO Meng Wanzhou, daughter of Huawei's founder Ren Zhengfei, was arrested in Canada on 1 December 2018 at the behest of U.S. authorities. U.S. Senator Ben Sasse accused China of undermining U.S. national security interests, often "using private sector entities" to by-pass US sanctions against the sale of telecom equipment to Iran.

According to political analyst, Andrew Leung, "China is perceived as the antagonist and rival of the United States," and that China's rise is seen as a "threat to the world order underpinned by American dominance or American values." He claimed, moreover, that the arrest of the CFO of Huawei on 1 December 2018 corresponded with the suspicious death on that same day of a leading Chinese-national quantum physicist and venture capitalist at Stanford University, Professor Shou-Cheng Zhang, who was on a H-1B visa, giving rise to conspiracy theories.  In August 2018, the U.S. government signed an update to legislation for the Committee on Foreign Investment in the U.S., broadening governmental scrutiny to vetting VC-backed, and especially Chinese state-funded, investments in U.S. tech startups.

Both sides signed the US–China Phase One trade deal on 15 January. Unlike other trade agreements, the agreement did not rely on arbitration through an intergovernmental organization like the World Trade Organization, but rather through a bilateral mechanism.

Rapid deterioration 

Michael D. Swaine warned in 2019, "The often positive and optimistic forces, interests, and beliefs that sustained bilateral ties for decades are giving way to undue pessimism, hostility, and a zero-sum mindset in almost every area of engagement."

According to two experts on US-China relations, Professor Rosemary Foot at Oxford University and Senior Lecturer Amy King at Australian National University, the consensus of experts is that:
The relationship began to deteriorate in the second decade of the 21st century, and that the Trump administration has accelerated the deterioration. Explanations...have ranged over a large number of factors, all of which have played some role. Some relate to changes in official personnel in both the United States and China, others to the shifts and relative power between the two countries after the global financial crisis of 2007–2008, and yet others to China's greater determination to reform global governance institutions and to play more of a global leadership role.

Foot and King emphasize China's aggressive efforts in developing cutting-edge technologies with significant military and commercial implications, while the United States sees the need to defend itself aggressively against technological theft.

U.S. academics have made various policy prescriptions for the United States within the context of its deteriorating relationship with China.

According to Hong Kong economics professor Lawrence J. Lau, a major cause of the deterioration is the growing battle between China and the U.S. for global economic and technological dominance. More generally, he argues, "It is also a reflection of the rise of populism, isolationism, nationalism and protectionism almost everywhere in the world, including in the US." According to Ian Bremmer, the U.S. and China are in a technology cold war and Trump's technology war against the PRC has been his administration's biggest foreign policy win, saying, "on the issue of tech decoupling that it was America out front with most allies on board." According to Greg Autry, an academic at the University of Southern California, Trump's China policy was working, pointing to increased revenue intakes by the Treasury Department and offshoring by US manufacturing supply chains from China, and crediting the administration for being the first to fully recognize that globalization hadn't delivered for Americans and that China was an existential threat.

Former Obama administration officials Samantha Power and Susan Rice have criticized China's actions on trade, over the Meng Wenzhou affair and in Hong Kong while simultaneously criticizing the Trump administration for inadequate pushback.

In 2018, the U.S. Department of Justice initiated a "China Initiative" to "combat economic espionage".

In 2019, a report of U.S.-China Economic and Security Review Commission suggested against calling the Chinese leader Xi Jinping by his title of "President," and instead recommended using the term "General Secretary of the Chinese Communist Party" under Xi's one-party leadership.

The Director of Policy Planning at the United States Department of State, Kiron Skinner drew international attention in April 2019 for stating at a foreign policy forum that the U.S. competition with China would be especially bitter, because unlike the Cold War with the Soviet Union which is "a fight within the Western family", "it's the first time that we will have a great-power competitor that is not Caucasian".

On 29 January 2020, the Interior Department's fleet of more than 800 Chinese-made drones, including those by DJI, were grounded, citing security concerns.

On 18 February 2020, the US government announced five Chinese state media firms would be designated "foreign missions", requiring them to be legally registered with the US government as a foreign government entity. On the following day, China took action against three American journalists with The Wall Street Journal by revoking their press credentials over a coronavirus opinion column which their paper had run. According to China, the column was racist and libelous; the CEO of the company that published the WSJ defended the article, as did the State department. A March 2020 article by Reuters said that Washington slashed the number of journalists allowed to work at U.S. offices of major Chinese media outlets to 100 from 160 due to Beijing's "long-standing intimidation and harassment of journalists". In response, China expelled about a dozen American correspondents with The New York Times, News Corp's Wall Street Journal and the Washington Post, which prompted criticism from the State Department. On 8 May, the US moved Chinese citizens at non-American news outlets from open-ended work visas to extendable 90-day work visas and in June the State Department designated a further four Chinese media outlets as foreign embassies.

By May 2020 relations had deteriorated as both sides were accusing the other of guilt for the worldwide coronavirus pandemic. Washington has mobilized a campaign of investigations, prosecutions and export restrictions. Beijing, meanwhile, has stepped up military activities in the contested South China Sea, and launched denunciations of American Secretary of State Mike Pompeo, and publicly speculating that the American military deliberately unleashed the virus in China. In the growing aspersion, on 15 May 2020, the US blocked shipments of semi-conductors to Huawei, while China, for its part, has threatened to place Apple, Boeing, and other US firms on "unreliable entities" lists, and has blamed the US government of using state power under the excuse of national security, and of abusing export control measures to continuously oppress and contain specific enterprises of other countries. Orville Schell, the director of the Center on US-China Relations at the Asia Society, summed up the situation as follows: "The consequences of the breakdown in US-China relations is going to be very grave for the world and for the global economy because the ability of the US and China to work together was the keystone of the whole arch of globalization and global trade. With that pulled out, there's going to be a tremendous amount of disturbance", often compared to the Cold War. However Tony Blair noted there is "an interconnectedness, economically and in trade terms between the US and China that just wasn't there in the US-Soviet Cold War" that makes it an imperfect analogy. He further felt the China-U.S. relations would be the "determining geopolitical relationship of the 21st century."

In June 2020, US Ambassador to the United Nations Kelly Craft sent a letter to the U.N. secretary general explaining the US position on China's "excessive maritime claims".

On 17 June 2020, President Trump signed the Uyghur Human Rights Policy Act, which authorizes the imposition of U.S. sanctions against Chinese government officials responsible for detention camps holding more than 1 million members of the country's Uyghur Muslim minority. On 9 July 2020, the Trump administration imposed sanctions and visa restrictions against senior Chinese officials, including Chen Quanguo, a member of China's powerful Politburo.

A research paper by the Begin–Sadat Center for Strategic Studies said that Chinese state-controlled media enthusiastically covered the protests and rioting attending the murder of George Floyd, comparing the American protests to the protests in Hong Kong and used the rioting and violence in the US as evidence that the democratic system was hypocritical and morally bankrupt. A report by the Australian Strategic Policy Institute said that racial tensions in the United States was a key area of focus for "a campaign of cross-platform inauthentic activity, conducted by Chinese-speaking actors
and broadly in alignment with the political goal of the People's Republic of China (PRC) to denigrate the standing of the US."

In July 2020, FBI Director Christopher Wray called China the "greatest long-term threat" to the United States. He said that "the FBI is now opening a new China-related counterintelligence case every 10 hours. Of the nearly 5,000 active counterintelligence cases currently under way across the country, almost half are related to China."

In July 2020, the Trump administration ordered the closure of the Chinese consulate in Houston. In response, the Chinese government ordered the closure of the US consulate in Chengdu.

On 20 July 2020, the United States sanctioned 11 Chinese companies, restricting any trade deal with America for what the US government said was their involvement in human rights violations in Xinjiang, accusing them specifically of using Uyghurs and other Muslim minorities in forced labor.

On 23 July 2020, US Secretary of State Mike Pompeo announced the end of what he called "blind engagement" with the Chinese government. He also criticized CCP general secretary Xi Jinping as "a true believer in a bankrupt totalitarian ideology".

In August 2020, Washington imposed sanctions on 11 Hong Kong and Chinese officials over what it said was their role in curtailing political freedoms in Hong Kong through the imposition of the Hong Kong national security law; China retaliated  by sanctioning 6 Republican lawmakers and 5 individuals at non-profit and rights groups.

In September 2020 the United States had under a 29 May presidential proclamation revoked more than 1,000 visas for PRC students and researchers visas who the US government said had ties to the Chinese military in order to prevent them from stealing and otherwise appropriating sensitive research.

On 26 September 2020, the US Commerce Department put restrictions on Chinese chip maker, Semiconductor Manufacturing International Corporation (SMIC), following which the suppliers were required to have an export license for exporting the chip. The restrictions were imposed after the US concluded that an "unacceptable risk" equipment supplied to SMIC could potentially be used for military purposes.

On 6 October 2020, Germany's ambassador to the UN, on behalf of the group of 39 countries including Germany, the U.K. and the U.S., made a statement to denounce China for its treatment of ethnic minorities and for curtailing freedoms in Hong Kong.

On 9 October 2020, the Department of Justice disallowed the use of its fund to purchase DJI drones, which the DoJ classified as a "Covered Foreign Entity".

On October 21, 2020, the US approved arms sales of $1.8 billion to Taiwan. It involved three packages that included high technology weapons such as SLAM-ER missiles, HIMARS M142 Launchers and Recce Pods. On 26 October 2020, China announced its intentions to impose sanctions on US businesses and individuals, including Boeing, Raytheon and Lockheed Martin. Taiwan welcomed the arms sales and disapproved of the sanctions. Taiwan also said it would continue buying arms from America.

A December 2020 report stated that U.S. intelligence officials assessed that China had supervised a bounty program paying Afghan militants to kill U.S. soldiers in Afghanistan.

On 5 December 2020, the U.S. State department ended five cultural exchange programs with China, which are - "the Policymakers Educational China Trip Program, the U.S.-China Friendship Program, the U.S.-China Leadership Exchange Program, the U.S.-China Transpacific Exchange Program and the Hong Kong Educational and Cultural Program." They described these programs as soft power propaganda tools of Chinese government.

In December 2020, an investigation by Axios was published that detailed the suspected activities of Christine Fang, a Chinese national who has been suspected by U.S. officials of having conducted political espionage for the Chinese Ministry of State Security (MSS) while she was in the United States from 2011 to 2015. While Fang's suspected activities prior to the Axios investigation had already drawn scrutiny from federal law enforcement agencies, the subsequent reactions to its publication drew further scrutiny from politicians and the media.

Biden administration (2021–current)

Relations with the new Biden administration in 2021 included heightened tensions over trade, technology, and human rights, particularly regarding Hong Kong, and the treatment of minorities in China. In addition international tensions regarding control of the South China Sea remained high. However the Biden and Xi administrations agreed to collaborate on long-term projects regarding climate change, nuclear proliferation, and the global COVID-19 pandemic.

On 20 January 2021, China imposed sanctions against outgoing US Secretary of State Mike Pompeo, former secretary of health and human services Alex Azar, former under secretary of state Keith J. Krach, outgoing US ambassador to the United Nations Kelly Craft, and 24 other former Trump officials. Biden's National Security Council called the sanctions "unproductive and cynical". In his nomination hearing, Blinken endorsed Pompeo's report that China is committing a genocide against Uyghurs, reaffirming Biden's campaign stance.

The new US Secretary of State, Antony Blinken, called-out China on its treatment of the ethnic Uighurs. President Biden, in his first foreign policy address, labeled China as "the most serious competitor" to the US. During his first visit to the Pentagon on 9 February 2021, Biden urged the United States Department of Defense to review its national security policy concerning China.

On March 12, 2021, Huawei, ZTE, Hytera, Hikvision, and Dahua Technology were designated as national security threats by the Federal Communications Commission.

On March 18–19, 2021, bilateral talks in Alaska took place. Blinken and national security advisor Jake Sullivan met with Politburo member Yang Jiechi and Chinese foreign minister Wang Yi. The Americans unleashed heated attacks on China's policies regarding human rights, cyberattacks, Taiwan, and its crackdown in Xinjiang and Hong Kong. The Chinese side countered by attacking the U.S's standing in the world and defending China's sovereign rights and model of development. In the week ahead of the talks, the administration met with U.S. allies in Asia and imposed sanctions on senior Chinese officials amidst Beijing's contemporaneous crackdown on Hong Kong.

On March 22, 2021, in conjunction with the European Union, United Kingdom and Canada, the United States imposed sanctions against Chinese officials in relation to the human rights violations in Xinjiang. The sanctions marked the first time the Biden administration took such coordinated action against Beijing.

On April 8, 2021, the US Commerce Department added seven Chinese supercomputing entities to its Entity List on national security grounds. This was the first action taken by the Biden administration to restrict Chinese access to US technology.

On June 3, 2021, Biden signed Executive Order 14032.

At their annual meeting on June 13, 2021, leaders from the Group of Seven (G7) democracies sharply criticized China for a series of abuses. The G7 nations—the United States, United Kingdom, Germany, France, Italy, Canada and Japan—had been hesitant about acting separately. Pressured by US President Joe Biden they unanimously agreed on a sharp criticism, followed the next day by a similar strong unanimous attack by NATO members.  The criticisms focused on the mistreatment of the Muslim Uyghur minority,  the systematic destruction of democracy in Hong Kong, repeated military threats against Taiwan, unfair trade practices, and lack of transparency regarding the origins of COVID-19. China rejected the criticism as interference in what it considers to be its internal policy matters.
 
In August 2021, China tested a nuclear-capable hypersonic missile, hypothesized as part of a Fractional Orbital Bombardment System, that circled the globe before speeding towards its target. The Financial Times reported that "the test showed that China had made astounding progress on hypersonic weapons and was far more advanced than U.S. officials realized."

On August 18, while discussing the larger ramifications of the US withdrawal from Afghanistan on cross strait relations, Biden said that the two cases were incomparable as the United States had an Article Five commitment to defend Taiwan. The remarks, which were the first by Biden to touch directly on US policy towards Taiwan, were interpreted as signalling a shift in the country's position of strategic ambiguity. A Biden administration official later said there had been no change to U.S. policy on Taiwan, and analysts said Biden appeared to have mischaracterized America's defense commitment to Taiwan.

On 15 September 2021, the United States, the United Kingdom, and Australia formed AUKUS.

In November 2021, the United States updated its assessment of China's nuclear weapon stockpile, showing that China will have 700 nuclear warheads by 2027, and that number will reach 1,000 by 2030.

Biden held his first virtual meeting with Chinese leader Xi Jinping on 15 November 2021.

On 24 November 2021, the Biden administration invited Taiwan to attend the 'Summit for Democracy' - to be held in December 2021. China's Foreign Ministry reacted by saying it was "firmly opposed" to the invitation.

On 2 December 2021, the US Securities and Exchange Commission finalized rules which would enable it to delist Chinese firms which have been determined to be non-compliant with the disclosure requirements as stipulated in the Holding Foreign Companies Accountable Act from US stock exchanges.

On 6 December 2021, the United States announced that it would diplomatically boycott the Beijing Olympics.

On 23 December 2021, Biden signed the Uyghur Forced Labor Prevention bill into law.

On 27 December 2021, Biden signed his first defense bill into law. Certain provisions of the act called for the enhancements to the security of Taiwan, including inviting the Taiwanese navy to the 2022 Rim of the Pacific exercise in the face of "increasingly coercive and aggressive behavior" by China.

On 27 February 2022, the White House urged China to condemn Russia's invasion of Ukraine. China accused the United States of being responsible for the war in Ukraine.

On 18 March 2022, Joe Biden and Xi Jinping directly communicated with each other for the first time since Russia's invasion of Ukraine.

In May 2022, Chinese officials ordered government agencies and state-backed companies to remove personal computers produced by American corporations and replace them with equipment from domestic companies. Bloomberg said the decision was one of China's most aggressive moves to eliminate the usage of foreign technology from the most sensitive parts of its government and spur its campaign to substitute foreign technology with domestic ones.

In late May 2022, the State Department restored a line on its fact sheet on US-Taiwan relations which it removed earlier in the month and stated it did not support Taiwanese independence. However, another line which was also removed in the earlier fact sheet that acknowledged China's sovereignty claims over Taiwan was not restored while a line that stated the U.S. would maintain its capacity to resist any efforts by China to undermine the security, sovereignty and prosperity of Taiwan in a manner that was consistent with the Taiwan Relations Act was added to the updated fact sheet.

On 11 June 2022, U.S. Secretary of Defense Lloyd Austin condemned China's "provocative, destabilising" military activity near Taiwan, a day after China's Defence Minister Wei Fenghe warned Austin that "if anyone dares to split Taiwan from China, the Chinese army will definitely not hesitate to start a war no matter the cost."

In July 2022, speaker of the house Nancy Pelosi announced that she would be leading a congressional delegation to the Indo-Pacific region. She has planned to visit Singapore, Malaysia, South Korea and Japan, as well as the island of Taiwan. China has responded to this by saying "it would constitute a gross interference in China's internal affairs", and continued military exercises within Chinese territories. When Pelosi visited the island the following month, the act was strongly condemned by China. As a result, China severed ties in all cooperation activities with the United States in several areas, including military matters, global climate cooperation, and drug trafficking enforcement. Later the State Department summoned Chinese ambassadors to complain about Chinese aggression. China claimed that the Pelosi visit served no other purpose than to provoke China and to deteriorate Sino-American relations while the United States, pointing to past precedent, said that Pelosi had the right to visit Taiwan and attacked the Chinese response as disproportionate. After Pelosi's departure, the PRC began military exercises encircling Taiwan.

On 7 October 2022, the US implemented new export controls targeting China's ability to access and develop advanced computing and semiconductor manufacturing items. The new export controls reflect the United States' ambition to counter the accelerating advancement of China's high-tech capabilities in these spaces to address foreign policy and national security concerns.

On 14 November 2022, Joe Biden and Xi Jinping met on the sidelines of the G20 summit in Bali for their first in-person encounter since Biden became president. The meeting lasted for more than 3 hours and they discussed a range of issues which included tensions over Taiwan and North Korea, and the war in Ukraine.

Some geoeconomics experts see an acceleration of the US–China rivalry as "inevitable" given the tensions manifested openly in the last months of 2022 and early 2023.  In a series of interviews with BBC News and Asharq News, Nicolas Firzli, director, EU ASEAN Centre, argued that "Cold War 2 with China [was] part of the Biden Doctrine, and the only remaining point of convergence between Biden and a Republic dominated Congress [...] January 2023 is the moment when things crystalized irreversibly".

On 2 February 2023, a suspected Chinese reconnaissance balloon was spotted flying over U.S. airspace in the state of Montana, potentially to collect information related to nuclear silos in the area. Two days later, the United States shot it down over the Atlantic Ocean, citing national security concerns. The balloon incident followed previous Chinese government actions targeting the U.S., including the Chinese theft of the designs for the F-35 about fifteen years earlier and successful Chinese government-sponsored cyberattacks targeting the Office of Personnel Management security clearance files (2015), the healthcare company Anthem (2015), and the Marriott International system (2018). In 2022, the U.S. and its allies imposed stringent additional export controls on the sale of "foundational technologies" (including advanced semiconductor chips and related technology) to China, with the aim of inhibiting any Chinese military buildup. The Biden administration has also sought to maintain critical-sector supply chains independent from China. The Beijing government expressed strong dissatisfaction and protest against the US's use of force, calling it a violation of international practice. The US claimed theballoon was a violation of its sovereignty.

On 11 February 2023, the US Commerce Department prohibed six Chinese companies connected to the aerospace programs of the Chinese army from acquiring US technology without authorization from the government. These six businesses include Nanjiang Aerospace Technology of Beijing; The 48th Research Institute of China Electronics Technology Group Corporation; Technology for Dongguan Lingkong Remote Sensing; Aviation Science and Technology Group of the Eagles Men; Tian-Hai-Xiang Aviation Technology in Guangzhou; together with the Shanxi Eagles Men Aviation Science and Technology Group.

Economic relations

In 1991, China only accounted for 1% of total imports to the United States.  For many years, China was the most important country which required an annual waiver to maintain free trade status. The waiver for the PRC had been in effect since 1980. Every year between 1989 and 1999, legislation was introduced in Congress to disapprove the President's waiver. The legislation had sought to tie free trade with China to meeting certain human rights conditions that go beyond freedom of emigration. All such attempted legislation failed to pass. The requirement of an annual waiver was inconsistent with the rules of the World Trade Organization, and for the PRC to join the WTO, Congressional action was needed to grant permanent normal trade relations (PNTR) to China. This was accomplished in 2000 (United States–China Relations Act of 2000), allowing China to join WTO in 2001. China's most favoured nation (MFN) status was made permanent on 27 December 2001.

Since the entry of entry of China into the WTO in December 2001, the decline in U.S. manufacturing jobs has accelerated (the China shock). The Economic Policy Institute estimated that the trade deficit with China cost about 2.7 million jobs between 2001 and 2011, including manufacturing and other industries.

The PRC and the US resumed trade relations in 1972 and 1973. Direct investment by the US in mainland China covers a wide range of manufacturing sectors, several large hotel projects, restaurant chains, and petrochemicals. US companies have entered agreements establishing more than 20,000 equity joint ventures, contractual joint ventures, and wholly foreign-owned enterprises in mainland China. More than 100 US-based multinationals have projects in mainland China, some with multiple investments. Cumulative US investment in mainland China is valued at $48 billion. The US trade deficit with mainland China exceeded $350 billion in 2006 and was the United States' largest bilateral trade deficit. Some of the factors that influence the U.S. trade deficit with mainland China include:

US Import Valuation Overcounts China: there has been a shift of low-end assembly industries to mainland China from newly industrialized countries in Asia. Mainland China has increasingly become the last link in a long chain of value-added production. Because US trade data attributes the full value of a product to the final assembler, mainland Chinese value added is overcounted.
US demand for labor-intensive goods exceeds domestic output: the PRC has restrictive trade practices in mainland China, which include a wide array of barriers to foreign goods and services, often aimed at protecting state-owned enterprises. These practices include high tariffs, lack of transparency, requiring firms to obtain special permission to import goods, inconsistent application of laws and regulations, and leveraging technology from foreign firms in return for market access. Mainland China's accession into the World Trade Organization is meant to help address these barriers.
The undervaluation of the Renminbi relative to the United States dollar.

Beginning in 2009, the US and China agreed to hold regular high-level talks about economic issues and other mutual concerns by establishing the Strategic Economic Dialogue, which meets biannually. Five meetings have been held, the most recent in December 2008. Economic nationalism seems to be rising in both countries, a point the leaders of the two delegations noted in their opening presentations. The United States and China have also established the high-level US-China Senior Dialogue to discuss international political issues and work out resolutions.

In September 2009 a trade dispute emerged between the United States and China, which came after the US imposed tariffs of 35 percent on Chinese tire imports. The Chinese commerce minister accused the United States of a "grave act of trade protectionism," while an USTR spokesperson said the tariff "was taken precisely in accordance with the law and our international trade agreements". Additional issues were raised by both sides in subsequent months.

When a country joins the World Trade Organization they commit to keep their Tariffs beneath the bound rate, which is generally around 39 percent.  China's reaction is due to the fact that nations usually keep their Tariffs at an average of 9 percent, but when the U.S. raised their Tariff on Chinese imported tires to 35 percent, it was still below the average bound rate.

Pascal Lamy cautioned: "The statistical bias created by attributing commercial value to the last country of origin perverts the true economic dimension of the bilateral trade imbalances. This affects the political debate, and leads to misguided perceptions. Take the bilateral deficit between China and the US. A series of estimates based on true domestic content can cut the overall deficit – which was $252bn in November 2010 – by half, if not more."

In early 2012, a dispute over rare earth minerals was brought into the light between the two countries. President Obama made an announcement that the United States would be one of a few countries to file a dispute with China.  Amongst the United States, Japan and other Western European countries would also be filing disputes as well.  This is simply just one of few disputes between the United States and China.  It is believed by many experts, including Chris Isidore, a writer for CNN Money, that "any one of the disputes could damage the economies of both countries as well as the relationship between them".  The dispute was filed, and China was charged with putting unfair restrictions on the exportation of rare earth minerals.  These minerals were crucial and in high demand by all countries.  President Obama believed the United States should have those minerals in the United States whereas China disagreed.  China denied all of the said charges brought forth "saying its rules are defensible on grounds of environmental and economic sustainability, and suggests there would be consequences if the United States presses the case."  It is important to understand the relationship between the United States and China, especially economically.  There is not one without the other.  China's state news agency commented that "past experiences have shown that policymakers in Washington should treat such issues with more prudence, because maintaining sound China-U.S. trade relations is in the fundamental interests of both sides"

China was the biggest trading partner of the United States until 2019, when it dropped to the third place because of the ongoing trade war.

In November 2021, U.S. producer Venture Global LNG signed a twenty-year contract with China's state-owned Sinopec to supply liquefied natural gas (LNG). China's imports of U.S. natural gas will more than double. U.S. exports of liquefied natural gas to China and other Asian countries surged in 2021, with Asian buyers willing to pay higher prices than European importers.

Currency dispute

China engaged in currency manipulation from 2003 to 2014. Economist C. Fred Bergsten, writing for the Peterson Institute for International Economics, said that, during this period, "China bought more than $300 billion annually to resist upward movement of its currency by artificially keeping the exchange rate of the dollar strong and the renminbi's exchange rate weak. China's competitive position was thus strengthened by as much as 30 to 40 percent at the peak of the intervention. Currency manipulation explained most of China's large trade surpluses, which reached a staggering 10 percent of its entire GDP in 2007." China's currency manipulation was a point of conflict with the United States. Domestic leaders within the United States pressured the Obama administration to take a hardline stance against China and compel China to raise the value of its currency, and legislation was introduced to the United States Congress calling on the President to impose tariffs on Chinese imports until China properly values its currency. Nonetheless, the United States was not willing to label China as a "currency manipulator" at that time, on the theory that doing so would risk China's cooperation on other issues.

In 2014, China stopped manipulating its currency, as the growth in the Chinese economy slowed and Chinese investors made more investments outside the country, leading to a drop in the yuan's value in relation to the dollar, as well as a decline in China's reserves.

In August 2019, five years after China had stopped manipulating its currency, the US Treasury designated China as a currency manipulator. Some U.S. analysts characterized the belated designation as "embarrassing", "without factual basis", or "a stretch". On 13 January 2020, the United States removed the designation as part of the Phase One efforts to reach a deal on the trade war.

Debt dispute
In the wake of America's debt ceiling crisis in 2011, China, as a major holder of US public debt expressed concern and criticism of US fiscal policy An article in the Associated Press said that China had few options other than to continue to buy United States Treasury bonds while an article in the Wall Street Journal described China's criticism as an attempt to deflect domestic criticism of its own economic management practices, policies and strategies. Prior to debt ceiling crisis, President Obama had said it was unsustainable for America's long term fiscal outlook to continue borrowing from China.

Important issues

Military spending and planning

The PRC's investment in its military is growing rapidly. The United States, along with independent analysts, remains convinced that the PRC conceals its real extent of its military spending. According to its government, China spent $45 billion on defense in 2007. Some very broad US estimates maintain that the PRC military spends between $85 billion and $125 billion. According to official figures, the PRC spent $123 million on defense per day in 2007. In comparison, the US spent $1.7 billion ($1,660 million) per day that year.

Concerns over the Chinese military budget may come from US worries that the PRC is attempting to threaten its neighbors or to challenge the United States. Concerns have been raised that China is developing a large naval base near the South China Sea and has diverted resources from the People's Liberation Army Ground Force to the People's Liberation Army Navy and to air force and missile development.

On 27 October 2009, US Defense Secretary Robert Gates praised the steps China has taken to increase transparency of defense spending. In June 2010, however, he said that the Chinese military was resisting efforts to improve military-to-military relations with the United States. Gates also said that the United States would "assert freedom of navigation" in response to Chinese complaints about US Navy deployments in international waters near China. Admiral Michael Mullen said that the United States sought closer military ties to China but would continue to operate in the western Pacific.

The International Institute for Strategic Studies, in a 2011 report, argued that if spending trends continue, China will achieve military equality with the United States in 15–20 years.

In 2012, it was reported that the United States would invite a team of senior Chinese logisticians to discuss the possibility of the first logistics co-operation agreement between the two countries.

Professor James R. Holmes, a specialist on China at the US Naval War College, has said that China's investments towards a potential future conflict are closer to those of the United States than may first appear because the Chinese understate their spending, the internal price structures of the two countries are different, and the Chinese need to concentrate only on projecting military force a short distance from their own shores. The balance may shift to the advantage of the Chinese very quickly if they continue double-digit annual growth, and the US and their allies cut back.

In line with power transition theory, the idea that "wars tend to break out... when the upward trajectory of a rising power comes close to intersecting the downward trajectory of a declining power," some have argued that conflict between China, an emerging power, and the United States, the current superpower, is all but inevitable.

Human rights

In 2003, the United States declared that despite some positive momentum that year and despite greater signs which showed that the People's Republic of China was willing to engage in discussions about human rights with the US and other nations, there was still serious backsliding. In principle, China has acknowledged the importance of the protection of human rights and it has claimed that it has taken steps to bring its own human rights practices into conformity with international norms. Among those steps are China's signing of the International Covenant on Economic, Social and Cultural Rights in October 1997, which was ratified in March 2001, and China's signing of the International Covenant on Civil and Political Rights in October 1998, which has not been ratified yet. In 2002, China released a significant number of political and religious prisoners and it also agreed to hold discussions about torture, arbitrary detention, and religion with UN experts. However, international human rights groups assert that there has been virtually no movement with regard to those promises, with more people having been arrested for similar offences since then. Those groups maintain that China still has a long way to go in instituting the kind of fundamental systemic change that will protect the rights and liberties of all its citizens in Mainland China. The US State Department publishes an annual report on human rights around the world, which includes an evaluation of China's human rights record.

In a decision that was criticized by human rights groups, the US State Department did not list China as one of the world's worst human rights violators in its 2007 report of human rights practices in countries and regions outside the United States. However, the assistant secretary of the State Department's Bureau of Democracy, Human Rights, and Labor Jonathan D. Farrar stated that China's overall human rights record in 2007 remained poor.

Since 1998, China has annually published a White Paper detailing the human rights abuses by the United States and since 2005 has also published a White Paper on its own political system and democratic progress.

On 27 February 2014, the United States released its China report on human rights practices for 2013, which, according to its executive summary, described the PRC as an authoritarian state and a place in which repression and coercion were routine. On 28 February 2014, China published a report on human rights in the United States that cited surveillance on its own citizens, mistreatment of inmates, gun violence, and homelessness, despite having a vibrant economy, as important issues.

US criticism of China on human rights, especially on the issue of the Xinjiang re-education camps, significantly expanded at the end of 2018 and in 2019. In March 2019, US Secretary of State Mike Pompeo indirectly compared China to the Nazi Germany by saying that the roundup of Muslim minorities to into camps had not been seen "since the 1930s". In May 2019, the United States government accused China of putting Uyghurs in "concentration camps". The US government has also considered sanctioning Chinese officials involved in the camps, including Chen Quanguo, the Communist Party Secretary of Xinjiang and a member of the 19th Politburo of the Chinese Communist Party although no Chinese Politburo member has ever been sanctioned by the US government. In July 2019, Vice President Mike Pence accused China of persecuting Christians, Muslims and Buddhists.

On 4 October 2019, the Houston Rockets' general manager, Daryl Morey, issued a tweet that supported the 2019–20 Hong Kong protests. Morey's tweet resulted in the Chinese Basketball Association's suspension of its relationship with the Houston Rockets and the issuance of a statement of dissatisfaction from the consulate office of China in Houston. On 6 October, both Morey and the NBA issued separate statements addressing the original tweet. Morey said that he never intended his tweet to cause any offense, and the NBA said the tweet was "regrettable". The statements were criticized by US politicians and third-party observers for the perceived exercise of economic statecraft by the PRC and insufficiency of the NBA's defense of Morey's tweet. Critics also contrasted the league's disparate response to Morey's tweet with its history of political activism  The statements also drew criticism from PRC state-run media for their perceived insufficiency, as Morey did not apologize.

In June 2020, the White House on 31st anniversary of the Tiananmen Square crackdown, asked Beijing to respect human rights, carry out its due commitments 
on Hong Kong, as well as flog persecution of ethnic and religious minorities. On 9 July 2020, the United States announced sanctions against Chinese politicians, who as per its record were responsible for human rights violations against Muslim minorities in Xinjiang.

On 20 July 2020, US government sanctioned 11 new Chinese companies from purchasing American technology and products over human rights violations in China targeting Uyghurs in the Xinjiang region.

Many American companies, including Delta Air Lines, Coach New York, Marriott International, Calvin Klein and Tiffany & Co. have apologized to China after "offending" the country and China's ruling Communist Party.

On September 15, 2020, the US government decided to take steps to block some exports from Xinjiang, over the country's alleged human rights abuses directed mostly against Uyghurs of the region.

In 2020, Chinese diplomats increasingly adopted "wolf warrior diplomacy" to deny all accusations of human rights abuses. Chinese foreign ministry spokesperson Zhao Lijian tweeted that as long as the US had problems itself, it "had no right" to criticize China on human rights abuses.

On 19 January 2021, Mike Pompeo officially declared that China is committing a genocide against Uighurs in the Xinjiang region. Pompeo called for "all appropriate multilateral and relevant juridical bodies, to join the United States in our effort to promote accountability for those responsible for these atrocities". Salih Hudayar, the prime minister of the East Turkistan Government-in-Exile (who claim to be the legitimate government of Xinjiang), has said, "We hope that this designation will lead to real strong actions to hold China accountable and bring an end to China's genocide."

On 20 January 2021, China imposed sanctions against outgoing US Secretary of State Mike Pompeo, former secretary of health and human services Alex Azar, former under secretary of state Keith J. Krach, outgoing US ambassador to the United Nations Kelly Craft, and 24 other former Trump officials. Biden's National Security Council called the sanctions "unproductive and cynical". In his nomination hearing, Blinken endorsed Pompeo's report that China is committing a genocide against Uyghurs, reaffirming Biden's campaign stance.

Influence in Asia

China's economic rise has led to some geo-political friction between the US and China in East Asia as well as to an extent in Southeast Asia and in Central Asia including Afghanistan. For example, in response to China's response to the bombardment of Yeonpyeong by North Korea, "Washington is moving to redefine its relationship with South Korea and Japan, potentially creating an anti-China bloc in Northeast Asia that officials say they don't want but may need." The Chinese government fears a conspiracy by the US to encircle it.

China and the US have recently led competing efforts to gain influence in Asian trade and development. In 2015, China led the creation of the Asian Infrastructure Investment Bank with the goal of financing projects that would spur the development of the lower-tier Asian economies, thus facilitating improved economic ties across the region. It has been suggested that the United States considered the AIIB to be a challenge to the US-backed Asian Development Bank and the World Bank and saw the Chinese effort as an attempt to set the global economic agenda on terms that would be formulated by the Chinese government. The Obama administration led an effort to enact the Trans-Pacific Partnership Agreement, a multilateral trade pact between a number of Pacific Rim countries, which excluded China. According to the US Trade Representative, the agreement was designed to "promote economic growth; support the creation and retention of jobs; enhance innovation, productivity and competitiveness; raise living standards; reduce poverty in the signatories' countries; and promote transparency, good governance, and enhanced labor and environmental protections."  The Partnership was anticipated to impose costs on businesses dependent on regional markets. The deal was placed on hold after the US withdrew from the agreement on 23 January 2017. The efforts are among the attempts by both the US and China to increase their influence over the Asia-Pacific by strengthening their economic ties within the region.

In 2009, the United States requested China to open the Wakhjir Pass on the Afghan-Chinese border as an alternative supply route for the U.S. and NATO in their campaign in Afghanistan. China refused the request.

Countries in Southeast Asia have responded to Chinese claims for sea areas by seeking closer relations with the United States. American Defense Secretary Leon Panetta said that in spite of budget pressures, the United States would expand its influence in the region to counter China's military buildup.

Shared concerns in the face of China have prompted the United States to step up cooperation with China's geopolitical rivals such as India, drawing greater opposition from China.

Cyberwarfare and election meddling

The US Department of Justice investigation into fundraising activities uncovered evidence that Chinese agents sought to direct contributions from foreign sources to the Democratic National Committee (DNC) before the 1996 presidential campaign. The Chinese embassy in Washington, D.C., was used to co-ordinate contributions to the DNC.

In 2014, Chinese hackers hacked the computer system of the US Office of Personnel Management, resulting in the theft of approximately 22 million personnel records that were handled by the office. Former FBI Director James Comey stated, "It is a very big deal from a national security perspective and from a counterintelligence perspective. It's a treasure trove of information about everybody who has worked for, tried to work for, or works for the United States government."

In October 2018, the Senate Homeland Security and Governmental Affairs Committee held a hearing on the threat to the US posed by China. Before the hearing, Bloomberg released an article that stated that China is embedding technology in microchips that are sent to America that collect data on American consumers. However, both FBI Director Christopher Wray and Homeland Security Secretary Kirstjen Nielsen declined to confirm that statement. Nielsen said that China has become a major threat to the US and also confirmed, in an answer to a question from a senator, that China is trying to influence US elections.

In 2019, two Chinese nationals were indicted for the Anthem medical data breach. About 80 million company records were hacked, stoking fears that the stolen data could be used for identity theft. In February 2020, the United States government indicted members of China's PLA for hacking into Equifax and plundering sensitive data as part of a massive heist that also included stealing trade secrets. Private records of more than 145 million Americans were compromised in the 2017 Equifax data breach.

The Voice of America reported in April 2020 that "Internet security researchers say there have already been signs that China-allied hackers have engaged in so-called "spear-phishing" attacks on American political targets" ahead of the 2020 United States elections. As of 7 July 2020, the U.S. government was 'looking at' banning Chinese video streaming application, TikTok due to national security concerns. Secretary of State Mike Pompeo said the Trump administration had been aware of the potential threat and has "worked on this issue for a long time". On 19 September 2020, a complaint was filed in Washington by TikTok and its parent company, ByteDance, challenging the recent moves made by the Trump administration to prevent the application from operating in the US. The court documents argued that the US government took the step for political reasons rather than to stop an "unusual and extraordinary threat".

Nuclear security 
The field of nuclear security (preventing nuclear material from being used to make illicit weapons) is a well-established area of successful U.S.-China cooperation.

Precipitated by a 2010 Nuclear Security Summit convened by the Obama administration, China and the United States launched a number of initiatives to secure potentially dangerous, Chinese-supplied, nuclear material in countries such as Ghana or Nigeria. Through these initiatives, China and the U.S. have converted Chinese-origin Miniature Neutron Source Reactors (MNSRs) from using highly enriched uranium to using low-enriched uranium fuel (which is not directly usable in weapons, thereby making reactors more proliferation resistant).

COVID-19

In relation to the impact of the COVID-19 pandemic on politics, the Trump administration referred to the coronavirus as the "Wuhan virus", terms which have been criticized for being racist and "distract[ing] from the Trump administration's failure to contain the disease". In return, some Chinese officials, including Zhao Lijian, rejected an earlier acknowledgement of the coronavirus outbreak starting in Wuhan, in favor of conspiracy theories that the virus originated in the U.S.The Daily Beast obtained a U.S. government cable outlining a communications strategy with apparent origins in the National Security Council, quoted as "Everything is about China. We're being told to try and get this messaging out in any way possible". Multiple U.S. intelligence agencies have reportedly been pressured by the Trump administration to find intelligence supporting conspiracy theories regarding the origins of the virus in China.

According to a New York Times report in April 2020, the U.S. intelligence community says China intentionally under-reported its number of coronavirus cases. Some outlets such as Politico and Foreign Policy have said China's efforts to send aid to virus-stricken countries is part of a propaganda push for global influence. EU foreign policy chief Josep Borrell warned there is "a geo-political component including a struggle for influence through spinning and the 'politics of generosity'". Borrell also said "China is aggressively pushing the message that, unlike the U.S., it is a responsible and reliable partner." China has also called for the U.S. to lift its sanctions from Syria, Venezuela and Iran, while reportedly sending aid to the latter two countries. Jack Ma's donation of 100,000 masks to Cuba was blocked by U.S. sanctions on April 3. Trade in medical supplies between the United States and China has also become politically complicated. Exports of face masks and other medical equipment to China from the United States (and many other countries) spiked in February, according to statistics from Trade Data Monitor, prompting criticism from The Washington Post that the United States government failed to anticipate the domestic needs for that equipment. Similarly, The Wall Street Journal, citing Trade Data Monitor to show that China is the leading source of many key medical supplies, raised concerns that US tariffs on imports from China threaten imports of medical supplies into the United States.

By May 2020, the relationship had deteriorated to the lowest point as both sides were recruiting allies to attack the other regarding guilt for the worldwide COVID-19 pandemic.
In September 2020, the trade war between China and the US alongside Beijing's behavior during the COVID-19 crisis have combined to worsen American public opinion about China.

On September 22, 2020, Donald Trump called on the United Nations to "hold China accountable for their actions", in a speech to the world body's General Assembly. President Trump blamed the Chinese government for the global spread of COVID-19, which had infected 31 million people worldwide and killed more than 965,000, by then.

On May 26, 2021, Joe Biden tasked the US intelligence community with investigating the origins of the pandemic. By August 2021, the intelligence probe assessed that the Chinese government did not have foreknowledge of the outbreak, yet the investigation did not render conclusive results on the origins. Of eight assembled teams, one (the Federal Bureau of Investigation) leaned towards a lab leak theory, four others (and the National Intelligence Council) were inclined to uphold a zoonotic origin, and three were unable to reach a conclusion. In February 2023, the U.S. Department of Energy revised its previous estimate of the origin from "undecided" to "low confidence" in favor of a laboratory leak. Following the Energy Department's revised conclusion, the Chinese foreign ministry called on the United States to "stop defaming China" with the lab leak theory, adding that the U.S. was politicizing a scientific issue.

Public perceptions 
Despite tensions during Barack Obama's presidency, the Chinese population's favorability of the US stood at 51% in Obama's last year of 2016, only to fall during the Trump administration.

Americans, especially older Republican voters, took an increasingly negative view of China and of Chinese Communist Party general secretary Xi Jinping during the COVID-19 pandemic, expressing economic, human-rights, and environmental concerns.

According to a 2020 survey by the Pew Research Center, 22% of Americans have a favorable view of China, with 73% expressing an unfavorable view, one of the  most negative perceptions of China. The poll also found that 24% (plurality) of Americans see China as the top threat to the US. Furthermore, surveys of the Chinese public also found a corresponding decrease in favorability towards the US, with 61% to 72% of them expressing an unfavorable view. Unfavorable opinions of China among Americans are at a new high in 2022, with more than 90% of U.S. adults saying China's partnership with Russia is a problem for the United States, a survey released by the Pew Research Center showed.

Despite the mutually negative views, the public on both sides overwhelmingly want the relationship to improve. Two-thirds of US respondents in a Harris poll published in 2023 agreed that the U.S. should "engage in dialogue as much as possible to reduce tensions" with China. US public support for engaging in dialogue increased by five percentage points since 2021.

See also

Geostrategic 

 American exceptionalism
 American espionage in China
 Blue Team (U.S. politics)
 Canada–China relations
 Chimerica
 Chinese espionage in the United States
 China Lobby
 Chinese Century
 China–United States trade war
 United States sanctions against China
 CIA Tibetan program
 Clash of Civilizations
 Foreign relations of China
 Foreign relations of the United States
 List of Chinese spy cases in the United States of America
 Cox Report
 Pax Americana
 Peaceful Evolution theory
 Quadrilateral Security Dialogue
 String of Pearls (Indian Ocean)
 Thucydides Trap

General 

 Air route authority between the United States and China
 Americans in China
 American nationalism
 Anti-American sentiment in mainland China
 Anti-Chinese sentiment in the United States
 Anti-Western sentiment in China
 Asian Americans
 Asian American activism
 Asian immigration to the United States
 Beijing–Washington hotline
 Chinese Americans
 Chinese nationalism
 Document Number Nine
 Group of Two
 Racism in China
 Racism in the United States
 Strategic Economic Dialogue
 Taiwan–United States relations
 U.S.–China Strategic and Economic Dialogue

Historic 

 History of Asian Americans
 History of Chinese Americans
 History of the Republic of China
 History of the People's Republic of China
 History of China–United States relations
 East Asia–United States relations
 1996 United States campaign finance controversy
 China Hands, American experts on China
 Hainan Island incident
 International relations since 1989
 Nixon in China
 Permanent normal trade relations
 Ping-pong diplomacy
 1989 Tiananmen Square protests and massacre
 United States-China Economic and Security Review Commission
 U.S. immigration policy toward the People's Republic of China
 US Department of Defense China Task Force
 Xenophobia and racism related to the COVID-19 pandemic

Notes

References

Further reading

 Burt, Sally. "The Ambassador, the General, and the President: FDR's mismanagement of interdepartmental relations in wartime China." Journal of American-East Asian Relations 19.3-4 (2012): 288–310.
 Chang, Gordon H. Fateful Ties: A History of America's Preoccupation with China. (Harvard UP, 2015). excerpt
 Cohen, Warren I. America's Response to China: A History of Sino-American Relations (5th ed. 2010) online
 Dulles, Foster Rhea. China and America: The Story of Their Relations Since 1784 (1981), general survey online
 Fairbank, John King. The United States and China (4th ed. Harvard UP, 1976). online
 Green, Michael J. By more than providence: Grand strategy and American power in the Asia Pacific since 1783 (Columbia UP, 2017). online
 Hunt, Michael H. "Americans in the China Market: Economic Opportunities and Economic Nationalism, 1890s-1931." Business History Review 51.3 (1977): 277–307. online
 Jackson, Carl T. "The Influence of Asia upon American Thought: A Bibliographical Essay." American Studies International 22#1 (1984), pp. 3–31, online covers China, India & Japan
 Matray, James I. ed. East Asia and the United States: An Encyclopedia of relations since 1784 (2 vol. Greenwood, 2002). excerpt v 2
 Pomfret, John. The Beautiful Country and the Middle Kingdom: America and China, 1776 to the Present (2016) review
 Schaller, Michael. The United States and China: Into the Twenty-First Century 4th ed 2015) 
 Song, Yuwu, ed. Encyclopedia of Chinese-American Relations (McFarland, 2006)
 Spence, Jonathan D. To Change China: Western Advisers in China  (1980)  excerpt
 Spence, Jonathan. "Western Perceptions of China from the Late Sixteenth Century to the Present" in Paul S. Ropp, ed.Heritage of China: Contemporary Perspectives on Chinese Civilization (1990) excerpts
 Sutter, Robert G. Historical Dictionary of United States-China Relations (2005).
 Varg, Paul A. "Sino-American Relations Past and Present." Diplomatic History 4.2 (1980): 101–112. online
 Wang, Dong. The United States and China: A History from the Eighteenth Century to the Present (2013)
 Westad, Odd Arne. Decisive encounters: the Chinese civil war, 1946-1950 (Stanford University Press, 2003). excerpt

Recent
 Blanchard, Jean-Marc F., and Simon Shen, eds. Conflict and Cooperation in Sino-US Relations: Change and Continuity, Causes and Cures (Routledge, 2015)
 Brazinsky, Gregg A. Winning the Third World: Sino-American Rivalry during the Cold War (U of North Carolina Press, 2017); four online reviews & author response 
 Chang, Gordon H. Friends and Enemies: The United States, China, and the Soviet Union, 1948–1972 (Stanford UP, 1990). online
 DeLisle, Jacques. "International law in the Obama administration's pivot to Asia: the China seas disputes, the Trans-Pacific Partnership, rivalry with the PRC, and status quo legal norms in US foreign policy." Case Western Reserve Journal of International Law   48 (2016): 143+ online.
 Doshi, Rush.  The Long Game: China's Grand Strategy to Displace American Order (Oxford UP, 2021) online review
 Dulles, Foster Rhea. American policy toward Communist China, 1949-1969 (1972)   online free to borrow
 Dumbaugh, Kerry. "China-U.S. relations: current issues and implications for U.S. policy." (Congressional Research Service (CRS) Reports and Issue Briefs, Congressional Research Service, 2009) online
 Fenby, Jonathan and Trey McArver. The Eagle and the Dragon: Donald Trump, Xi Jinping and the Fate of US/China Relations (2019)
 Foot, Rosemary. The practice of power: US relations with China since 1949 (Oxford UP, 1995). online
 Foot, Rosemary, and Amy King. "Assessing the deterioration in China–US relations: US governmental perspectives on the economic-security nexus." China International Strategy Review 1.1 (2019): 39–50. online
 
 Fravel, M. Taylor. Active Defense: China's Military Strategy since 1949 (Princeton UP, 2019) online reviews
 
 Garson, Robert. "The Road to Tiananmen Square: The United States and China, 1979-1989" Journal of Oriental Studies .ISSN 0022-331X (1992) 30#1/2 pp. 119–135
 Garver, John W. 
 China's Quest: The History of the Foreign Relations of the People's Republic (2015), 59–91, 232–58, 286–314, 557–578. 607–673. 
 Foreign relations of the People's Republic of China (1992) online
 Goh, Evelyn. "Nixon, Kissinger, and the 'Soviet card' in the US opening to China, 1971–1974." Diplomatic history 29.3 (2005): 475–502. online
  Pdf.
 Hilsman, Roger. To move a nation; the politics of foreign policy in the administration of John F. Kennedy (1967) pp 275–357; on 1961–63. online
 Hu, XueYing. "Legacy of Tiananmen Square Incident in Sino-US Relations (post-2000)." East Asia 33.3 (2016): 213–232. abstract
 
 Isaacs, Harold R. Scratches on Our Minds: American Images of China and India (1958) online
 Kissinger, Henry. On China (2011)  excerpt
 Li, Cheng. "Assessing US-China Relations Under the Obama Administration" (The Brookings Institution, 30 August 2016) online
 MacMillan, Margaret. Nixon and Mao: the week that changed the world (2008). online
 Mahbubani, Kishore, "What China Threat?  How the United States and China can avoid war", Harper's Magazine, vol. 338, no. 2025 (February 2019), pp. 39–44.  "China could... remain a different polity—... not a liberal democracy—and still not be a threatening one." (p. 44.)
 Mann, Jim. About face: A history of America's curious relationship with China, from Nixon to Clinton (Knopf, 1999)
 Mastanduno, Michael. "A grand strategic transition?: Obama, Trump and the Asia Pacific political economy." in The United States in the Indo-Pacific (Manchester UP, 2020) online.
 Meltzer, Joshua P. "The U.S.-China trade agreement – a huge deal for China." Brookings (2017) online
 Rich, Wilbur C. ed. Looking Back on President Barack Obama's Legacy: Hope and Change (2018) excerpt
 Roach, Stephen S. Unbalanced: the codependency of America and China (Yale UP, 2015).
 Roberts, Priscilla. "New Perspectives on Cold War History from China," Diplomatic History 41:2 (April 2017) online
 Rose, Robert S. et al. Re-examining the Cold War: U.S.-China Diplomacy, 1954–1973 (2002)
 Kevin Rudd (Prime Minister of Australia June - September 2013): The Avoidable War: The Dangers of a Catastrophic Conflict between the US and Xi Jinping's China (PublicAffairs, March 2022, ISBN 978-1541701298)

 Schmitt, Gary J. "The China Dream: America's, China's, and the Resulting Competition." AEI Paper & Studies (American Enterprise Institute, 2019), p. 1J+. online
 Schoen, Douglas E. and Melik Kaylan. Return to Winter: Russia, China, and the New Cold War Against America (2015)
 Steinberg, James and Michael E. O'Hanlon, eds. Strategic Reassurance and Resolve: US-China Relations in the Twenty-First Century (Princeton UP, 2014).
 Suettinger, Robert. Beyond Tiananmen: The Politics of US-China Relations, 1989–2000 (Brookings Institution Press, 2004). online
 Tyler, Patrick. A Great Wall: Six Presidents and China (1999)
 Wang, Dong. "Grand Strategy, Power Politics, and China's Policy toward the United States in the 1960s," Diplomatic History 42:1 (April 2017): 265–287; 
 Westad, Odd Arne, "The Sources of Chinese Conduct: Are Washington and Beijing Fighting a New Cold War?", Foreign Affairs, 98#5 (September / October 2019), pp. 86–95. "If some unifying factor does not intervene, the decline in the United States' ability to act purposefully will, sooner than most people imagine, mean not just a multipolar world but an unruly world – one in which fear, hatred, and ambition hold everyone hostage to the basest instincts of the human imagination." (p. 95.) online
 Wheeler, Norton. Role of American NGOs in China's Modernization: Invited Influence (Routledge, 2014) 240 pp. online review
 Worden, Robert L. et al. eds. China: a country study (Federal Research Division, U.S. Library of Congress, 1986) comprehensive Library of Congress Country Studies 732pp report on Chinese history, society, economy, military and foreign relations; as a US government document it is not copyright. The Library produced separate reports on 82 countries; it ended the program in 1989. online
 Xia, Yafeng and Zhi Liang. "China's Diplomacy toward the United States in the Twentieth Century: A Survey of the Literature," Diplomatic History 42:1 (April 2017): 241–264.

 Yim, Kwan Ha. 
 China and the US: 1955-63 (1973). online
 China 1964-72 (1975). online
 China since Mao (1980) pp 129–60 online
 Zhang, Biwu. Chinese Perceptions of the U.S.: An Exploration of China's Foreign Policy Motivations (Lexington Books; 2012) 266 pages; Chinese views of America's power, politics, and economics, as well as the country as a source of threat or opportunity.

Historiography
 Brazinsky, Gregg. "The Birth of a Rivalry: Sino-American Relations During the Truman Administration" in Daniel S. Margolies, ed. A Companion to Harry S. Truman (2012)   pp 484–497; emphasis on historiography.
 Sutter, Robert. "The Importance of the 'pan-Asian' versus the 'China-first' Emphasis in US Policy toward China, 1969-2008: A Review of the Literature." American Journal of Chinese Studies (2009): 1–18.
 Sutter, Robert. "US Domestic Debate Over Policy Toward Mainland China and Taiwan: Key Findings, Outlook and Lessons." American Journal of Chinese Studies (2001): 133–144.
 Zhu Yongtao. "American Studies in China" American Studies International 25#2 (1987) pp. 3–19 online

Primary sources

 May, Ernest R.  ed. The Truman Administration and China 1945–1949 (1975) summary plus primary sources. online

China White Paper 1949
Lyman Van Slyke, ed. The China White Paper: August 1949 (1967: 2 vol. Stanford U.P.); 1124 pp.; copy of official U.S. Department of State. China White Paper: 1949 vol 1 online at Google; online vol 1 pdf; vol 1 consists of history; vol 2 consists of primary sources and is not online; see library holdings via World Cat
excerpts appear in Barton Bernstein and Allen J. Matusow, eds. The Truman Administration: A Documentary History (1966) pp. 299–355

 
United States
Bilateral relations of the United States